The 2021 Kelly Cup playoffs of the ECHL began on June 7 following the conclusion of the 2020–21 ECHL regular season, and ended on July 2 with the Fort Wayne Komets winning their first Kelly Cup over the South Carolina Stingrays in four games.

Playoff format
Due to the COVID-19 pandemic, only 14 of the 26 member teams participated in the season, the playoff field was cut from 16 teams to eight, and there were no divisions. As the start of the season was delayed and extended to later in the year than normal, each playoff series is a best-of-five tournament, down from the previous 2019 playoffs and planned 2020 playoffs that consisted of best-of-seven series.

Due to the postseason being pushed later into the year than typical, both the South Carolina Stingrays and Wichita Thunder were forced to play home games out of their practice rinks over scheduling conflicts with their normal home arenas.

Playoff seeds
After the regular season, eight teams qualify for the playoffs. The Wichita Thunder were the first team to qualify during the regular season on May 16. Due to the imbalanced scheduling during the pandemic, teams were seeded by points percentage.

Final seeds and points percentages:

Eastern Conference 
Florida Everblades – Brabham Cup winners, conference champions, .667 pts%
Greenville Swamp Rabbits – .632 pts%
Indy Fuel – .594 pts%
South Carolina Stingrays – .579 pts%

Western Conference
Allen Americans – Conference champions, .653 pts%
Wichita Thunder – .634 pts%
Fort Wayne Komets – .618 pts%
Utah Grizzlies – .563 pts%

Playoff bracket

Final results.

Conference semifinals

Eastern Conference

(1) Florida Everblades vs. (4) South Carolina Stingrays

(2) Greenville Swamp Rabbits vs. (3) Indy Fuel

Western Conference

(1) Allen Americans vs. (4) Utah Grizzlies

(2) Wichita Thunder vs. (3) Fort Wayne Komets

Conference finals

Eastern Conference

(2) Greenville Swamp Rabbits vs. (4) South Carolina Stingrays

Western Conference

(1) Allen Americans vs. (3) Fort Wayne Komets

Kelly Cup finals 
Note: Italics signify games to be played only if necessary.

(W3) Fort Wayne Komets vs. (E4) South Carolina Stingrays

Statistical leaders

Skaters
These are the top ten skaters based on points. 

''GP = Games played; G = Goals; A = Assists; Pts = Points; +/– = Plus/minus; PIM = Penalty minutes

Goaltending

This is a combined table of the top five goaltenders based on goals against average and the top five goaltenders based on save percentage, with at least 240 minutes played as of June 30. The table is sorted by GAA, and the criteria for inclusion are bolded.

GP = Games played; W = Wins; L = Losses; OTL = Overtime Losses; SA = Shots against; GA = Goals against; GAA = Goals against average; SV% = Save percentage; SO = Shutouts; TOI = Time on ice (in minutes)

See also 
 2020–21 ECHL season
 List of ECHL seasons

References

External links
ECHL website

Kelly Cup playoffs
2020–21 ECHL season